Andre Agustiar Prakoso (born 24 April 1996), is an Indonesian professional footballer who plays as a right winger or right-back for Liga 2 club PSIM Yogyakarta.

Club career

Mitra Kukar
In 2017, Agustiar signed a year contract with Mitra Kukar. He made his league debut on 15 April 2017 in a match against Barito Putera. On 3 September 2017, Agustiar scored his first goal for Mitra Kukar against Madura United in the 84th minute at the Aji Imbut Stadium, Tenggarong.

Badak Lampung
He was signed for Badak Lampung to play in Liga 2 in the 2020 season. This season was suspended on 27 March 2020 due to the COVID-19 pandemic. The season was abandoned and was declared void on 20 January 2021.

Persita Tangerang
In 2021, Agustiar signed a contract with Indonesian Liga 1 club Persita Tangerang. He made his debut on 2 October 2021 in a match against Borneo at the Pakansari Stadium, Cibinong. Andre scored his first goal for Persita against PSIS Semarang in the 46th minute at the Sultan Agung Stadium, Bantul.

PSIM Yogyakarta
Agustiar was signed for PSIM Yogyakarta to play in Liga 2 in the 2022–23 season. He made his league debut on 18 August 2022 in a match against PSKC Cimahi at the Si Jalak Harupat Stadium, Soreang.

References

External links
 Andre Agustiar at Soccerway
 Andre Agustiar at Liga Indonesia

1996 births
Living people
Indonesian footballers
Liga 1 (Indonesia) players
Liga 2 (Indonesia) players
Mitra Kukar players
Badak Lampung F.C. players
Badak Lampung F.C.
Association football defenders
People from Kediri (city)
Sportspeople from East Java